Cycle three of Suomen huippumalli haussa aired from April to June 2010 on the Finnish channel Nelonen.

The winner of the competition was 19-year-old Jenna Kuokkanen from Porvoo. Her prizes were a contract with Paparazzi Model Management, a 6-page editorial spread in Finnish Elle and a special casting trip to New York City and a position as the new spokesperson for Max Factor. 3 contestants Stephanie Cook, Anna Nevala & Saara Sihvonen all have gone to have successful careers after the season aired.

Episode summaries

Premiere
Original airdate: 12 April 2010

Saimi Hoyer holds open castings at Stockmanns in Oulu, Lappeenranta, Turku and Tampere. 50 are chosen to come to Helsinki where they meet with stylist Tommy Kilponen and make-up artist Karoliina Kangas. After a clothing and make-up change and Polaroids, the judges choose 20 for the next round of casting. The girls individually meet with the judges then get a 10-frame photo shoot with Sakari Majantie. After deliberation, Anne Kukkohovi announces the finalists.

Let the Games Begin (Kilpailu käynnistyy)
Original airdate: 19 April 2010

The girls move into the model house then meet Saimi Hoyer at Kamppi for a catwalk lesson. Tommi Kilponen gives the girls their challenge and Nina wins with a prize of 40 extra frames for the photo shoot and gets to keep her outfit from Vero Moda. The girls are suspended in the air for the photo shoot to show freshness and lightness in their faces for an advert for Subway.
At panel, Jenna gets best photo of the week for her happiness and freshness. Anette and Saara land in the bottom two for their poor photos. In the end, Anette is sent home because the judges felt she's just a pretty girl.
First call-out: Jenna Kuokkanen
Bottom two: Anette Häikiö & Saara Sihvonen
Eliminated: Anette  Häikiö

The Mirror Shows your Good Sides and the Bad (Peili paljastaa hyvät ja huonot puolet)
Original airdate: 26 April 2010

Anne Kukkohovi visits the girls and discuss what they like and don’t like about themselves. Next Trainer4You reps Janne Mustonen and Tuomo Kilpeläinen pay a visit to do a body analysis and have a workout. The next day are makeovers where French hair stylist Franck Provost for the Irresistible Summer 2010 collection. The weekly challenge is to see who is the most professional during the makeover. Tiia wins a gift basket and a pair of Christian Louboutin high heels. For the week's photo, the models must concentrate on themselves in the mirror.

At panel, Stephanie is eliminated for her lack of versatility.

First call-out: Tiia Hakala
Bottom two: Nelli & Stephanie Cook
Eliminated: Stephanie Cook

Girls in a Store Window (Tytöt näyteikkunassa)
Original airdate: 4 May 2010

The girls get an improv lesson from Jaana Saarinen. For the challenge, the girls are split into three groups and they must pose in a Sokos window promoting Max Factor mascara. Team two wins, getting 10 extra frames for the photo shoot. The week's photo shoot is for Franck and Fabien Provost hairstyles where the girls must demonstrate teamwork while holding on to their individualitites. At the judging panel, Jenna lands in the bottom two, but in the end it is Krista who is sent home.
First call-out: Tiia Hakala
Bottom two: Jenna Kuokkanen & Krista Naumanen
Eliminated: Krista Naumanen

Episode 5
Original airdate: 10 May 2010

The girls do an underwater shoot for Classic ice cream. No one is eliminated and all the remaining girls are flown to Milan.
First call-out: Anna Nevala
Bottom three: Ira, Jenna Kuokkanen & Nina Puotiniemi
Eliminated: None

Episode 6
Original airdate: 17 May 2010

The girls go to Milan for go-sees and Jenna gets a new haircut. Mari and Nelli get the best feedback at the castings and get to go on a private jet to Stockholm. The week's photo shoot is for Hästens beds.

Nina and Saara are in the bottom, both for the second time. Nina becomes the fourth girl to leave the competition. 
First call-out: Nelli
Bottom two: Nina Puotiniemi & Saara Sihvonen
Eliminated: Nina Puotiniemi

Episode 7
Original airdate: 24 May 2010

Mari and Nelli go to a manor in Stockholm and the next day meet special guest Miss J. Alexander. After returning from Sweden, all the girls meet with Miss J. for a runway lesson. Next the girls go to a Marimekko fashion show and cocktail party where the girls are being watched to find out who has the best social skills. In addition to the gift bags that all the girls get, the winner, Saara, receives a large Marimekko gift box. The photo shoot is an editorial for Elle with handbags as an accessory. Tiia was again the best model of the week. Both Nelli and Anna are eliminated and Anne tells the rest of the girls that they are going on a trip.
First call-out: Tiia Hakala
Bottom two/eliminated: Anna Nevala & Nelli
Special guest: J. Alexander

Episode 8
Original airdate: 31 May 2010

The girls fly to Egypt. The girls are given 100 Egyptian pounds, an adjective and a 1/2-hour to buy clothes at the bazaar to fit the adjective. Next the girls got to the beach and meet with Saimi. The challenge of the week is to balance pitchers of red wine on their heads while walking on the sand in high heels. Saara wins the challenge. The photo shoot is tourist photos for the Tjäreborg travel company. Ira is criticised for not having model body requirements and Mari for having a negative attitude with the client. Ira is sent home.
First call-out: Jenna Kuokkanen
Bottom two: Ira & Mari
Eliminated: Ira

Episode 9
Original airdate: 7 June 2010

The girls go snorkeling after which Sakari meets them at Luxor Temple. The challenge is to take photographs and present the best five. The idea is to know what it is like on the other side of the camera as a photographer. The photo shoot is for Fazer Geisha. The girls, made up as geishas, must emulate softness as both the original Geisha chocolate bar and the new flavour Dreamy Caramel. Tiia is once again the best model of the week, and Mari narrowly misses out on a place in the final.

First call-out: Tiia Hakala
Bottom two: Mari & Saara Sihvonen
Eliminated: Mari

Episode 10
Original airdate: 14 June 2010

The girls' final photo shoot is a beauty shoot for Max Factor. For the final judging, there is a runway challenge between the three finalists for Vero Moda in front of an audience of family and friends.

Jenna is declared the third winner of Finland's Next Top Model. 
Final three: Jenna Kuokkanen, Saara Sihvonen & Tiia Hakala
Finland's Next Top Model: Jenna Kuokkanen

Contestants
(ages stated are at start of contest)

Summaries

Call-out order

 The contestant was eliminated
 The contestant was part of a non-elimination bottom three
 The contestant won the competition

In episode 1, the finalists were selected. After the announcement of the top 10, Nina was added to the cast as the eleventh finalist.
In episode 1, Ira's call-out was not shown due to a possible editing mistake.
In episode 2, Anna's call-out was not shown due to a possible editing mistake.
In episode 5, no-one was eliminated.

Photo shoot guide 
Episode 1 photo shoot:  Beauty shots (casting)
Episode 2 photo shoot:  Light and airy flying
Episode 3 photo shoot: Konehelsinki ads
Episode 4 photo shoot: Franck & Fabien Provost hair
Episode 5 photo shoot: Classic ice cream pool  
Episode 6 photo shoot: Hästens bed commercials
Episode 7 photo shoot: Editorial shoot for Elle
Episode 8 photo shoot: Tourists for Tjäreborg
Episode 9 photo shoot: Fazer geisha
Episode 10 photo shoot: Max Factor ads

References

External links
Nelonen homepage (in Finnish)
Nelonen homepage (in English)
Suomen huippumalli haussa homepage

Suomen huippumalli haussa

fi:Suomen huippumalli haussa